NHL 2K7 is an ice hockey video game made by 2K Sports, and published on the PlayStation 3, PlayStation 2, Xbox, and Xbox 360 consoles. It features San Jose Sharks centre Joe Thornton on its cover. Bob Cole and Harry Neale return from NHL 2K6 to provide commentary. David Vyborny appeared on the cover of the PS2 version in the Czech Republic.

New features in the rug include improved animations that are mainly geared towards skating. 2K7 also includes a new gameplay setting called "Cinemotion". This feature uses close up camera angles as well as dramatic music to capture the intensity of the game.

The game was also the first ice hockey simulation to be made for the PlayStation 3.

Reception

The game received "generally favorable reviews" on all platforms except the PlayStation 2 version, which received "average" reviews, according to the review aggregation website Metacritic.

See also
NHL 2K

References

External links

Official Website

2K Sports games
07
Ice hockey video games
Xbox games
Xbox 360 games
PlayStation 2 games
PlayStation 3 games
2006 video games
Video games developed in the United States
Video games set in 2006
Video games set in 2007
Take-Two Interactive games